Loceri is a comune (municipality) in the Province of Nuoro in the Italian region Sardinia, located about  northeast of Cagliari and about  southwest of Tortolì.

Loceri borders the following municipalities: Bari Sardo, Ilbono, Lanusei, Osini, Tertenia.

Demographic evolution

References

Cities and towns in Sardinia